Crotalaria laburnifolia, called the rattle pod, is a highly variable species of flowering plant in the genus Crotalaria, widely distributed in central, eastern and southern Africa, the Seychelles, the Indian Subcontinent, Thailand, the Lesser Sunda Islands, Java, and Queensland in Australia. It has been introduced into Western Australia. It has gained the Royal Horticultural Society's Award of Garden Merit.

References

laburnifolia
Taxa named by Carl Linnaeus
Plants described in 1753
Flora of Africa
Flora of Seychelles
Flora of the Indian subcontinent
Flora of Thailand
Flora of Java
Flora of the Lesser Sunda Islands
Flora of Queensland